Moudi Najjar (born 20 June 2000) is an Australian professional footballer who plays as a forward for A-League club Macarthur FC.

Club career

Western Sydney Wanderers
At the age of 17, Najjar played his first game in his youth starting career. Najjar came on for Mohamed Adam while scoring his first goal for Western Sydney Wanderers Youth in an 8–0 win over Canberra United Youth.

Najjar was part of the 2017-18 Y-League championship winning Western Sydney Wanderers Youth team. He replaced Fabian Monge in the 71st minute as they beat Melbourne City Youth 3–1 in the 2018 Y-League Grand Final on 3 February 2018.

Melbourne City
On 1 July 2017, Najjar signed a two-year scholarship contract with Melbourne City. He made his professional debut as a second-half substitute in a Round 15 clash with his former club Western Sydney Wanderers, City running out 4–3 winners at AAMI Park.

Najjar signed his first professional contract on 11 September 2019, penning a two-year deal with the club. He scored his first A-League goal in the final regular season match of the 2019–20 season, a 3–1 win over Western United.

Macarthur
Following the conclusion of the 2019–20 A-League season, Najjar went on loan to new A-League club Macarthur for the 2020–21 A-League season. He also played for their National Premier Leagues NSW affiliate club, Northbridge FC.

In July 2021, Macarthur confirmed that Najjar's loan agreement with Melbourne City had been mutually closed, allowing Najjar to sign a two-year contract with Macarthur.

Honours
Western Sydney Wanderers
 Y-League: 2017–18 
  Macarthur
  Australia Cup :  2022

Individual
 Y-League Golden Boot: 2018–19

References

External links
 

2000 births
Living people
Sportsmen from New South Wales
Soccer players from New South Wales
Australian people of Lebanese descent
Australian soccer players
Association football midfielders
Association football forwards
Western Sydney Wanderers FC players
Melbourne City FC players
Macarthur FC players
Northbridge FC players
A-League Men players
National Premier Leagues players
Australia youth international soccer players